Krn is a small village below Mount Krn in the Municipality of Kobarid in the Littoral region of Slovenia (northwestern Slovenia).

Notable people
Notable people that were born or lived in Krn include:
Simon Rutar (1851–1903), historian

References

External links

Krn at Geopedia

Populated places in the Municipality of Kobarid